The Piedras River, better known as Río Piedras in Spanish, is a river of San Juan, Puerto Rico. The river gives its name to Río Piedras, a former town and municipality, today a district of San Juan.

Even if the Piedras River is considered a tributary of the Puerto Nuevo River, the hydrological basin it belongs to is often referred to as the Río Piedras watershed and it is ecologically important for the San Juan Bay estuary and the metropolitan region. The river is fed by numerous creeks and streams which have their source in the barrios of Caimito and Cupey.

Gallery

See also 
 Old Piedras River Aqueduct
 List of river of Puerto Rico

References

External links 
 

Rivers of Puerto Rico
San Juan, Puerto Rico